Foldback may refer to:
Foldback (power supply design), a current-limiting device in power amplifiers
Foldback (sound engineering), a speaker used to direct sound to performers